Richard Peter Harvey (born 3 August 1974) is an English cricketer.  Harvey is a left-handed batsman who bowled slow left-arm orthodox.  He was born in Stoke-on-Trent, Staffordshire.

Harvey made his debut for Staffordshire in the 1997 Minor Counties Championship against Buckinghamshire.  Harvey has played Minor counties cricket for Staffordshire from 1997 to present, which has included 71 Minor Counties Championship matches and 41 MCCA Knockout Trophy matches.  In 1998, he made his List A debut against Leicestershire in the NatWest Trophy.  He made 10 further appearances in List A cricket, the last coming against Surrey in the 2005 Cheltenham & Gloucester Trophy.  In his 11 List A matches, he scored 201 runs at an average of 25.12, with a high score of 66.  His highest score came against the Durham Cricket Board in the 1999 NatWest Trophy.

References

External links
Richard Harvey at ESPNcricinfo
Richard Harvey at CricketArchive

1974 births
Living people
Cricketers from Stoke-on-Trent
English cricketers
Staffordshire cricketers
Staffordshire cricket captains